Gillabhrenainn Ua hAnradhain (died 1134) was Abbot of Clonfert.

See also 
 Corpus of Electronic Texts

References

 Annals of Ulster at CELT: Corpus of Electronic Texts at University College Cork
 Annals of Tigernach at CELT: Corpus of Electronic Texts at University College Cork
Revised edition of McCarthy's synchronisms at Trinity College Dublin.
 Byrne, Francis John (2001), Irish Kings and High-Kings, Dublin: Four Courts Press, 

Christian clergy from County Galway
12th-century Irish abbots
1134 deaths
Year of birth unknown